The Long Road Home – In Concert is a DVD and double live album by American singer-songwriter John Fogerty released by Fantasy Records in 2006. The DVD was released on June 13 with the live album following on October 31. The album featured many songs from the 2005 compilation The Long Road Home.

Track listings 
All songs written and composed by John C. Fogerty.

DVD 
 "Intro"
 "Travelin' Band"
 "Green River"
 "Who'll Stop the Rain"
 "Blue Moon Nights"
 "Lodi"
 "Lookin' Out My Back Door"
 "Hot Rod Heart"
 "Rambunctious Boy"
 "She's Got Baggage"
 "Born on the Bayou"
 "Bootleg"
 "Run Through the Jungle"
 "Déjà Vu (All Over Again)"
 "Have You Ever Seen the Rain?"
 "Tombstone Shadow"
 "Keep on Chooglin'"
 "Sweet Hitch-Hiker"
 "Hey Tonight"
 "Down on the Corner"
 "Centerfield"
 "Up Around the Bend"
 "The Old Man Down the Road"
 "Fortunate Son"
 "Bad Moon Rising"
 "Rockin' All Over the World'
 "Proud Mary"
 "Outro" (Credits)
Bonus Track 
 "Déjà Vu (All Over Again)" (Music video)

Two-disc CD 
Disc one
 "Intro" – 0:37
 "Travelin' Band" – 2:24
 "Green River" – 3:21
 "Who'll Stop the Rain" – 3:02
 "Blue Moon Nights" – 3:21
 "Lodi" – 3:39
 "Lookin' Out My Back Door" – 2:48
 "Hot Rod Heart" – 4:32
 "Rambunctious Boy" – 3:48
 "She's Got Baggage" – 3:18
 "Born on the Bayou" – 4:10
 "Bootleg" – 2:51
 "Run Through the Jungle" – 4:19
 "Déjà Vu (All Over Again)" – 3:56

Disc two
 "Have You Ever Seen the Rain?" – 2:46
 "Tombstone Shadow" – 3:54
 "Keep on Chooglin'" – 4:09
 "Sweet Hitch-Hiker" – 2:49
 "Hey Tonight" – 2:30
 "Down on the Corner" – 2:56
 "Centerfield" – 3:55
 "Up Around the Bend" – 2:49
 "The Old Man Down the Road" – 4:16
 "Fortunate Son" – 2:52
 "Bad Moon Rising" – 2:17
 "Rockin' All Over the World" – 3:19
 "Proud Mary" – 3:56

Personnel 
The following people contributed to The Long Road Home – In Concert:
 John Fogerty – lead vocals, guitar, harmonica, record producer
 Bob Britt – guitar, backing vocals
 Billy Burnette – guitar, backing vocals
 Matt Nolen – keyboards, guitar
 George Hawkins Jr – bass guitar, backing vocals
 John Molo – drums
 Martyn Atkins – director
 James Pluta – film producer

Charts and certifications

References

External links 

John Fogerty albums
John Fogerty video albums
2006 video albums
Live video albums
2006 live albums
Fantasy Records live albums
Fantasy Records video albums
Albums produced by John Fogerty